Coromandel is a New Zealand electoral division returning one member to the House of Representatives. It is currently represented by Scott Simpson, a member of the National Party.

Population centres
The previous electoral redistribution was undertaken in 1875 for the 1875–1876 election. In the six years since, New Zealand's European population had increased by 65%. In the 1881 electoral redistribution, the House of Representatives increased the number of European representatives to 91 (up from 84 since the 1875–76 election). The number of Māori electorates was held at four. The House further decided that electorates should not have more than one representative, which led to 35 new electorates being formed, including Coromandel, and two electorates that had previously been abolished to be recreated. This necessitated a major disruption to existing boundaries.

There were 84 electorates for the 1969 election, and the 1972 electoral redistribution saw three additional general seats created for the North Island, bringing the total number of electorates to 87. Together with increased urbanisation in Christchurch and Nelson, the changes proved very disruptive to existing electorates. In the South Island, three electorates were abolished, and three electorates were newly created. In the North Island, five electorates were abolished, two electorates were recreated (including Coromandel), and six electorates were newly created.

The 1987 electoral redistribution took the continued population growth in the North Island into account, and two additional general electorates were created, bringing the total number of electorates to 97. In the South Island, the shift of population to Christchurch had continued. Overall, three electorates were newly created, three electorates were recreated (including Coromandel), and four electorates were abolished. All of those electorates were in the North Island. Changes in the South Island were restricted to boundary changes.

The current Coromandel seat is based around the Coromandel Peninsula, and contains the main Coromandel towns of Thames, Whitianga, and Whangamatā. To the south of the electorate is the Hauraki District which contains the main townships of Paeroa, Waihi and Ngatea. It also extends an arm down into the Bay of Plenty, to take the town of Katikati, with its southern boundary on the edge of the Tauranga urban area.

2007 boundary review
Following the 2006 Census of Population and Dwellings, the Representation Commission decided to move the southern boundary of Coromandel away from Tauranga, so that Katikati will be the only large Bay of Plenty town in the seat. This is the largest change in Coromandel's makeup to date, and the new seat was fought for the first time at the 2008 election.

History
It existed for three terms until 1890 and was represented by Alfred Cadman.

The electorate was recreated in 1972 for the 37th session of the New Zealand Parliament. It existed for two terms until 1978 and was represented by Leo Schultz of the National Party, who had previously represented the Hauraki electorate. The Coromandel electorate was abolished again and the area again covered by the Hauraki electorate.

The electorate was once again recreated in 1987 for the 42nd session of the New Zealand Parliament. It existed for two terms until 1993 and was represented by Graeme Lee representing the National Party. The Coromandel Peninsula was afterwards covered by the Hauraki electorate, with its southern portion going into the Matakana electorate.

The electorate was again recreated in 1996 for the 45th session, which was the first term under the Mixed-member proportional representation (MMP) electoral system.

The new MMP Coromandel electorate was won by Murray McLean of the National Party in 1996. In 1999, Green party co-leader Jeanette Fitzsimons won the electorate, after then Labour Leader (and Prime Minister after the election) Helen Clark openly encouraged Labour supporters to give their constituency vote to Fitzsimons and their party vote to Labour. The Green Party believes that this was the first time in the world that a Green MP had won an electorate in the first past the post voting system, and it would be the only instance of a Green MP being elected by a New Zealand electorate until the party won Auckland Central at the 2020 election. The electorate returned to National in the 2002 election, with Sandra Goudie the representative.

Members of Parliament
Key

List MPs
Members of Parliament elected from party lists in elections where that person also unsuccessfully contested the Coromandel electorate. Unless otherwise stated, all MPs' terms began and ended at general elections.

Election results

2020 election

2017 election

2014 election

2011 election

Electorate (as at 26 November 2011): 45,697

2008 election

2005 election

2002 election

1999 election

1996 election

Table footnotes

Notes

References

External links
Electorate Profile, Parliamentary Library

New Zealand electorates
1881 establishments in New Zealand
1972 establishments in New Zealand
1987 establishments in New Zealand
1996 establishments in New Zealand
1890 disestablishments in New Zealand
1978 disestablishments in New Zealand
1993 disestablishments in New Zealand